Gabriel Ogbechie (OON) (born 28 May 1966) is a Nigerian business executive and philanthropist who founded the Rainoil Group, one of Nigeria's largest indigenous oil and gas company.

Early life and education 
Ogbechie hails from Idumuje Ugboko in Aniocha North Local Government Area of Delta state and was born to an average home and the fifth of six children. He attended Queen of the Niger Primary School, Onitsha, and St. Patrick's College, Asaba, after which he proceeded to the University of Benin (Nigeria), where he obtained a Bachelor of Science (B.Sc.) degree in Production Engineering.

Gabriel Ogbechie is a pioneer member of the Lagos Business School Owner Manager Programme 2002. He was awarded an Honorary Doctorate (D.Sc.) in Technology Management by Novena University, Ogume, Delta State in 2016.

Career

Early Career 
Ogbechie began his career working in an Accounting firm before landing his first job as a Sales Operations Manager in the oil and gas industry in the early 1990s.

Rainoil Limited 
In 1997, Ogbechie founded Rainoil Limited. The downstream oil and gas company owns three depots in Nigeria.
In December 2017, Rainoil announced the annual Rainoil Tennis Open in partnership with the Nigerian Tennis Federation. Ogbechie revealed that the objective of Rainoil bankrolling a national open tournament was to pave way for an international tournament that would see stars from various parts of the world come to play in Nigeria.

Norsworthy Agro Allied Company Limited 
In 2017, the Delta State Government under the administration of Ifeanyi Okowa partnered with Ogbechie's Norsworthy Limited in a $20 million deal for the construction of an agro-allied industrial palm plantation built on 1,400 hectares of land owned by Akwukwu-Igbo, Ugbolu, and Ilah communities in Oshimili North Local Council of Delta State. Ogbechie currently sits as the chairman of the company.

Preline Limited 
In October 2021, Ogbechie's Preline Limited acquired a controlling stake in Eterna Oil, thereby making him the Chairman of the Eterna oil board of directors.

Philanthropy 

Through the establishment of the Gabriel Ogbechie Foundation, he has been involved in many philanthropic causes particularly in Delta State, where he provides scholarships to undergraduates, community healthcare services as well as youth employment initiatives.

In 2019, during the COVID-19 pandemic in Nigeria, Ogbechie donated ambulances and other medical equipment to the Federal Medical Centre, Asaba to support the fight against the virus in the country.

Controversy 

In December 2020, Ogbechie was accused in a public statement released by his fellow kinsman and Billionaire Ned Nwoko of plotting against him. Ogbechie has since denied the allegations. On November 30, 2022, the Nigerian Police Force, following its investigations submitted to the Federal High Court in Abuja a report clearing Ogbechie of complicity in the alleged assassination plot.  Ogbechie has filed a one billion naira suit against Ned Nwoko for defamation of character.

Awards and recognition 
In 2018, Ogbechie was named the Downstream Man of the Year at the annual Oil Trading and Logistics Conference which was held in Lagos, Nigeria. On October 11, 2022, in Abuja, Ogbechie was conferred with the honour of Officer of the Order of the Niger (OON) by the Federal Government of Nigeria under the administration of President Muhammadu Buhari.

Personal life 
Ogbechie is married to Godrey Ogbechie and both have three children.

References

Living people
1966 births
People from Delta State
Nigerian philanthropists
Nigerian businesspeople
Nigerian billionaires
20th-century Nigerian businesspeople
21st-century Nigerian businesspeople
Nigerian Christians
Nigerian company founders